Anton Cadar (18 January 1941 – 13 August 1989) was a Romanian gymnast. He competed in eight events at the 1964 Summer Olympics.

References

1941 births
1989 deaths
Romanian male artistic gymnasts
Olympic gymnasts of Romania
Gymnasts at the 1964 Summer Olympics
Sportspeople from Târgu Mureș